François Jacques Fleischbein (1804–1868) was a German painter who lived and worked in New Orleans.

Biography
Fleischbein was born in Godramstein, Palatinate, nowadays Germany, in 1804. He studied painting in Paris with Anne-Louis Girodet. In 1833, he and his wife, Marie Louis Tetu, immigrated to cosmopolitan New Orleans, thus joining the community of international painters seeking fame in Louisiana.
Although born Franz Joseph, Fleischbein decided to change his name to François in order to fit with his Creole clients of Gallic descent.

His paintings show a French academic style as well as a sweetness and charm common to 19th-century German painting.
With the invention of the daguerreotype in 1839, Fleischbein also worked as an early photographer, an enterprise in which his wife took part.

References

Bibliography
Old Sketchbook recalls early New Orleans artist, Times-Picayuna, George E. Jordan, 1976
Old Louisiana Plantation Homes and Family Trees, Herman de Bachelle Seebold, vol. 1, p 23

External links

19th-century German painters
19th-century American male artists
German male painters
19th-century American painters
American male painters
1804 births
1868 deaths
German emigrants to the United States
19th-century American photographers
Artists from New Orleans
Photographers from Louisiana
People from Landau